Oscar Schönfelder (born 5 February 2001) is a German professional footballer who plays as a winger for 2. Bundesliga club Jahn Regensburg, on loan from Werder Bremen.

Club career
A youth product for Mainz 05 since 2013, Schönfelder transferred to Werder Bremen on 30 June 2020. He made his professional debut with Werder Bremen in a 2–0 DFB-Pokal win over Osnabrück on 7 August 2021.

In June 2022, it was announced Schönfelder would join Jahn Regensburg on loan for the 2022–23 season.

International career
Schönfelder is a youth international for Germany, having represented the Germany U16s, U17s, Germany U18s and U19s.

Career statistics

References

External links
 
 
 Bundesliga Profile

2001 births
Living people
Footballers from Frankfurt
German footballers
Association football wingers
Germany youth international footballers
SV Werder Bremen players
SV Werder Bremen II players
SSV Jahn Regensburg players
2. Bundesliga players
Regionalliga players